Captain Ernest James Salter was a Canadian World War I flying ace credited with nine aerial victories. He returned to service during World War II.

Early life
Ernest James Salter was born in Greenbank, Ontario, Canada on 9 November 1897. He was the son of Mary Helen Coultis and Theophilus L. Salter. Ernest was living in Mimico when he enlisted in the Royal Flying Corps on 3 June 1917.

World War I
Salter trained as a pilot and was awarded Royal Aero Club Pilot's Certificate No. 7211 on 27 August 1917. He was commissioned as a probationary temporary second lieutenant on 13 October 1917. He then sailed from Canada on 29 October 1917. He was appointed a Flying Officer on 26 February 1918, and arrived in France on 15 March 1918. He joined 54 Squadron from 19 March to 12 April 1918, when he was hospitalized. He rejoined the squadron on 19 May 1918. He was promoted to captain on 9 August 1918; such promotions were given to those appointed as Flight Commander. On 2 September 1918, Salter was wounded in action.  He was invalided back to England on 7 September 1918. Although he won no British awards, Salter was honoured by the French with the Legion d'Honneur on 30 November 1918 as well as the Croix de guerre avec Palme.

List of aerial victories

Post World War I
Salter was repatriated on 29 March 1919. He reputedly flew as a bush pilot for three years afterwards. He returned to duty in World War II, serving as a bombing instructor.

Ernest James Salter died in Oakville, Ontario, Canada on 26 March 1959.

References

1897 births
1959 deaths
People from Scugog
Canadian World War I flying aces